Ladda monospila is a species of butterfly in the family Hesperiidae. It is found in Bolivia.

References

Butterflies described in 1898
Hesperiidae of South America
Taxa named by Paul Mabille